Hoboken Terminal is a commuter-oriented intermodal passenger station in Hoboken, Hudson County, New Jersey. One of the New York metropolitan area's major transportation hubs, it is served by nine NJ Transit (NJT) commuter rail lines, one Metro-North Railroad line, various NJT buses and private bus lines, the Hudson–Bergen Light Rail, the Port Authority Trans Hudson (PATH) rapid transit system, and NY Waterway-operated ferries. 

More than 50,000 people use the terminal daily, making it the ninth-busiest railroad station in North America and the sixth-busiest in the New York area. It is also the second-busiest railroad station in New Jersey, behind only Newark Penn Station, and its third-busiest transportation facility, after Newark Liberty International Airport and Newark Penn Station.

The rail and ferry terminal buildings were constructed in 1907 by the Delaware, Lackawanna and Western Railroad a former Class 1 railroad. In 1930, Thomas Edison was at the controls for the first departure of a regular-service electric multiple unit train from Hoboken Terminal to Montclair. In 1973 the terminal building was added to the New Jersey Register of Historic Places and the National Register of Historic Places.

Hoboken Terminal is considered a milestone in American transportation development, initially combining rail, ferry, subway, streetcar and pedestrian services. Later on in time bus, and light-rail were added to the terminals as well. Another thing noted in the terminal's design is the terminal's 225-foot (69 m) clock tower. The tower was replaced by a radio tower that stood for more than half a century, until being removed in June 2006, when it was replaced with a new clock tower modeled after the original.

History

19th century 
The site of the terminal had been used since colonial times to link Manhattan Island and points west. In 1811, the first steam-powered ferries began called Hoboken Ferryboats service under John Stevens, an inventor who founded Hoboken. In 1889, due to several complaints through The New York Times, changes were made to the service such as bigger boats for passengers, and more trips.

The coming of the railroads brought more and more travelers to the west bank of the Hudson River. Cuts and tunnels were constructed through Bergen Hill to rail–ferry terminals on the west bank of the river and the Upper New York Bay. The first of the Bergen Tunnels under Jersey City Heights was opened in 1877 by the Morris and Essex Railroad, which was leased by the Delaware, Lackawanna, and Western Railroad (DL&W).

20th century 
The facility that was in the place of the Hoboken Terminal caught fire and burned down in 1905 after the Hopatcong a ferry docked at the terminal, caught fire at midnight and spread to the original facility. The Delaware, Lackawanna and Western Railroad decided to build another large terminal since they had more than enough funds to do so. The new facility was planned by William Truesdale who worked to modernize the DL&W railroad. The rail and ferry terminal buildings were constructed in 1907 by the Delaware, Lackawanna and Western Railroad.

The following year, the railroad opened the second parallel tunnel. Both tunnels are still used by NJ Transit. The tubes of the Hudson and Manhattan Railroad, forerunner of PATH, were extended to Hoboken Terminal upon its opening. The first revenue train on the new line ran from the terminal on February 26, 1908.

The rail and ferry 
In 1930, Thomas Edison was at the controls for the first departure of a regular-service electric multiple unit train from Hoboken Terminal to Montclair. One of the first installations of central air-conditioning in a public space was at the station, as was the first non-experimental use of mobile phones.

In 1942, the clock tower of the terminal was removed to reclaim the copper to use it in World War II. After the war, Hoboken suffered another blow when the cars and planes rose to prominence. Amtrak started operating in 1971, and by then intercity services by the then merged Erie and DL&W railroads stopped operating out of Hoboken. The final train between Hoboken and Chicago departed the night of January 5, 1970, and arrived January 6 in Chicago's Dearborn Station.

Despite the difficulties of the railroad industry which culminated in bankruptcy for many railroads through the 1970s, the terminal has always been an essential link for New York-bound commuters, which saved it from the threat of demolition. The popular disapproval of the razing of the nearby Pennsylvania Station in 1963, (and its replacement by Madison Square Garden and a new Penn Station below ground level) may have also helped Hoboken Terminal's survival.

Numerous streetcar lines (eventually owned and operated by the Public Service Railway), including the Hoboken Inclined Cable Railway, originated and terminated at the station until bustitution was completed on August 7, 1949.

At the peak of intercity rail service, five passenger terminals were operated by competing railroad companies along the Hudson Waterfront. Of the five, Hoboken Terminal is the only one still in active use. Those at Weehawken (New York Central), Pavonia (Erie Railroad), and Exchange Place (Pennsylvania Railroad) were demolished in the 1960s, while the one in Jersey City (Central Railroad of New Jersey) was partially restored and is now part of Liberty State Park.

In October 1956, four years before its merger with the DL&W to form the Erie Lackawanna Railway, the Erie Railroad began to shift its trains from Pavonia Terminal to Hoboken. The final Erie trains to be moved to Hoboken, in 1959, were from the Northern Branch. In October 1965, on former Erie routes, there were five trains each weekday to Wanaque/Midvale on the Greenwood Lake branch, three to Nyack on the Northern Branch, three to Waldwick via the Newark Branch, two to Essex Fells on its Caldwell Branch, two to Carlton Hill on the former Erie Main Line, and one to Newton on the Sussex Branch. All those trains were dropped in 1966.

Ferry service from the terminal to lower Manhattan ended on November 22, 1967, due to declining ridership and revenues. It resumed in 1989 on the south side of the terminal and moved back to the restored ferry slips inside the historic terminal on December 7, 2011.

In 1973 the terminal building was added to the New Jersey Register of Historic Places and the National Register of Historic Places.

In 1990, the New Jersey Historic Preservation Bond Program gave a grant of $400,000 towards repairs and restoration of the Terminal. In 1991, another grant of $300,000 was given. The money was used towards repairing the ferry terminal's roof, and clerestory.

21st century 

On August 14, 2003, amid the Northeast blackout of 2003 PATH and NJ Transit Rail Operations were unable to operate anywhere including the Hoboken Terminal. Commuters from New Jersey used the NY Waterway ferry to the Hoboken Terminal as an alternative, and passengers said it was so packed it caused concern. Operations of PATH and NJ Transit trains resumed the morning of the August 15 with the use of diesel trains.

Access to the Region's Core (ARC) was a proposed to add new rail tunnels under the Hudson River, but the plan was canceled in 2010. In 2013, the New Jersey General Assembly passed a resolution supporting the extension of New York City Number 7 subway into Secaucus as a cheaper alternative to the proposed ARC tunnel. The plans never went through despite the idea being revived as possibly being apart of or along with the Gateway project which also proposes new tunnels, and bridges over the Hudson river.

A renovation that lasted from 2005 to 2009 demolished and rebuilt walls to resemble their original appearance; the terminal's clock tower was rebuilt as well along with the original neon-lit Lackawanna sign.

The station was badly damaged during Hurricane Sandy on October 29, 2012. Daytime PATH service to midtown Manhattan was restored on December 19. The waiting room reopened in January 2013, while extensive repairs were still in progress. Pre-Sandy service patterns were gradually restored by March 1, 2013.

As of 2017, the station was the ninth-busiest railway station in North America.

On October 5, 2022, officials broke ground on Hoboken Connect, a projected five-year project to renovate the Terminal and its immediate vicinity. The plans call for erecting a 20-story commercial building at 5 and 23 Hudson Place and a 28-story, 389-unit residential building on Observer Highway. Planned improvements to Warrington Plaza include movable seats and modular structures for public use. The ferry terminal will be renovated to add retail space and bicycle storage on the ground floor, while commercial space on its second floor would be constructed to house either transport functions, or tenants such as markets, eateries, or areas for arts and culture. A new bus depot is planned for Hudson Place, pending NJ Transit approval.

Accidents
In December 1985, an NJ Transit train crashed into the concrete bumper at Hoboken Terminal, injuring 54. The 1985 crash was said to have been caused by a lubricant that had been applied to the tracks to test train wheels.

In May 2011, a PATH train crashed into a bumper block at Hoboken Terminal, injuring 34 people; the Port Authority said the train came in too fast.

On the morning of September 29, 2016, an NJ Transit train crashed through a stopblock and into the concourse of the station, killing one person and injuring more than 110 people. Tracks 10 through 17 were reopened on October 10, 2016, with most remaining tracks reopened a week later. The pedestrian concourse reopened on May 14, 2017. Track 6 reopened for service in June 2017 and Track 5 reopened for service sometime around September 2018. The planning for permanent repairs to the concourse roof and supports were ongoing during this time. Permanent repairs and renovations began in March 2019 and were completed by the end of 2019.

Design
Hoboken Terminal is considered a milestone in American transportation development, initially combining rail, ferry, subway, streetcar and pedestrian services, in one of the most innovatively designed and engineered structures in the nation, with bus and light-rail service added in the ensuing decades. The terminal was also one of the first stations in the world to employ the Bush-type train shed, designed by and named for Lincoln Bush of the DL&W, which quickly became ubiquitous in station design. The terminal building was designed by architect Kenneth M. Murchison in the Beaux-Arts style. The structure is made of concrete, copper, stone, steel, and wrought iron. The complex has 14 tracks for NJ Transit trains, which are located entirely above the water.

The station is unusual for a New York City area commuter railroad terminal in that it still has low-level platforms, requiring passengers to use stairs on the train to board and alight. The Long Slip Fill and Rail Enhancement project is anticipated to add three high level ADA-accessible platforms to the south side of the terminal.

The terminal's  clock tower was designed by architect Kenneth Murchison, and originally built with the terminal. Its copper cladding was intended to provide a dramatic decorative effect. By the post-World War II period, this patina had been lost to wind erosion, and was removed in about 1950 following a storm. The tower was replaced by a radio tower that stood for more than half a century, until being removed in June 2006, when it was replaced with a new clock tower modeled after the original, down to the same copper cladding, albeit with a more modern steel and aluminum infrastructure that would better withstand wind erosion. The second tower includes a clock with 12-foot diameter faces and  copper letters, which spell out "LACKAWANNA", whose fiber optic technology allow the them to be lit from dusk to midnight.

The large main waiting room features floral and Greek Revival motifs in tiled stained glass by Louis Comfort Tiffany set atop bands of pale cement. The terminal exterior extends to over four stories and has a copper-clad façade with ornate detailing. Its single-story base is constructed of rusticated Indiana limestone. A grand double stair with decorative cast-iron railings within the main waiting room provides an entrance to the upper-level ferry concourse.

Services

Commuter rail

Hoboken Terminal is the terminus and namesake for NJ Transit's Hoboken Division, which consists of commuter rail lines in northern New Jersey.

 Bergen County Line
 Main Line
 Meadowlands Rail Line (event service)
 Pascack Valley Line
 Montclair-Boonton Line 
 Morristown Line and Gladstone Branch of the Morris and Essex Lines 
 North Jersey Coast Line (limited service)
 Port Jervis Line
 Raritan Valley Line (one inbound morning weekday train only)

Access to other NJ Transit rail lines is available at Newark Penn Station (which also serves Amtrak), Secaucus Junction, or Newark Broad Street.

Rapid transit

PATH trains provide 24-hour service from a three-track underground terminal located north of the surface platforms. Two routes are offered on weekdays during the day, and one route is offered on late nights, weekends and holidays. Entrances are from the main concourse or street, below the Hudson Place bus station with both an elevator and stairs. Travel to Newark Penn Station always requires a transfer, as does weekday service to Journal Square Transportation Center.

Light rail

Hoboken Terminal is the terminus for two of the three Hudson-Bergen Light Rail routes. Light rail platforms are located south of Track 18 and the terminal building.

Ferry

Ferry service is operated by NY Waterway to Brookfield Place Terminal daily, as well as Pier 11/Wall Street and West Midtown Ferry Terminal on weekdays. The ferry concourse has five slips, numbered 1–5. Slips 1 and 5 are generally used for ferries heading to West Midtown, Slip 2 is generally used for Wall Street ferries, and Slip 3 is generally used for Brookfield Place ferries.

Bus service
Ten routes operated by New Jersey Transit Bus Operations serve Hoboken. Lanes 1-5 are underneath the covered "Hoboken Bus Terminal" adjacent to Track 1, while Lane 6 lies at the curb adjacent to the main commuter rail concourse.

Route  departs from Lane 1 for Jersey City, route  departs from Lanes 2 and 3 for the Port Authority Bus Terminal in Manhattan, and routes  depart from Lane 4 for American Dream Meadowlands in East Rutherford or Nungessers. Routes  depart from Lane 5 for Weehawken or Union City, and routes  departs from Lane 6 for Lakewood, or Old Bridge.

Former named trains

Environs and access

Though the passenger facilities are located within Hoboken, large parts of the infrastructure that supports them are located in Jersey City. The Hoboken/Jersey City line cuts across the rail yard at a northwest diagonal from the river to the intersection of Grove Street and Newark Street. It is at this corner that Observer Highway begins running parallel to the tracks and creating a de facto border for Hoboken. Motor vehicle access to the station is extremely limited. At the eastern end of Observer Highway buses are permitted to enter their terminal. Other vehicles are required to do a dog-leg turn onto Hudson Place. This  street (designated CR 736) is the only one with motor vehicle traffic adjacent to the station. In 2009, pedestrian access to the terminal from the south was made possible with the opening of a new segment of the Hudson River Waterfront Walkway.

In media
The station has been used for film shoots, including Funny Girl, Three Days of the Condor, Once Upon a Time in America, The Station Agent, The Curse of the Jade Scorpion, Julie & Julia, Kal Ho Naa Ho, Rod Stewart's "Downtown Train" video (1990) and Eric Clapton's video for his 1996 single "Change the World".

References

External links

 Metro-North station page for Hoboken
 PATH station details
 Hoboken Terminal Website
 
 
 

NJ Transit Rail Operations stations
Former Delaware, Lackawanna and Western Railroad stations
Hudson-Bergen Light Rail stations
PATH stations in New Jersey
Buildings and structures in Hoboken, New Jersey
Railway stations in the United States opened in 1907
Railway stations on the National Register of Historic Places in New Jersey
Ferry terminals in New Jersey
NJ Transit Bus Operations
Transit hubs serving New Jersey
Railway stations in Hudson County, New Jersey
Clock towers in New Jersey
Tourist attractions in Hudson County, New Jersey
Historic American Engineering Record in New Jersey
National Register of Historic Places in Hudson County, New Jersey
Ferry terminals on the National Register of Historic Places
Transportation buildings and structures on the National Register of Historic Places in New Jersey
1907 establishments in New Jersey
Railway stations located underground in New Jersey
Railway stations serving harbours and ports